Sabina Rosengren Jacobsen (born 24 March 1989) is a Swedish handball player for Lugi HF and the Swedish national team.

International honours  
EHF Champions League:
Bronze Medalist: 2018
Cup Winners' Cup:
Winner: 2015
European Championship:
Silver Medalist: 2010
Bronze Medalist: 2014
Carpathian Trophy:
Winner: 2015

Individual Awards   
European Championship Best Defensive Player: 2014
 Swedish Elitserien Top Scorer: 2007, 2008, 2009
 Swedish Female Handballer of the Year: 2013

References

External links

1989 births
Living people
Swedish female handball players
Sportspeople from Lund
Expatriate handball players
Swedish expatriate sportspeople in Denmark
Swedish expatriate sportspeople in Romania
Handball players at the 2016 Summer Olympics
Olympic handball players of Sweden
Lugi HF players
21st-century Swedish women